Events in the year 1712 in Norway.

Incumbents
Monarch: Frederick IV

Events
April - Caspar Herman Hausmann was appointed commander-in-chief of the Norwegian army.
4 August -  was appointed Vice Steward of Norway.

Arts and literature

Births
22 June – Michael Heltzen, mining engineer (died in 1770).

Deaths
24 June – Hans Munch, theologian and priest, bishop of Christianssand and of Christiania (born 1654).

See also

References